is a Japanese manga series written and illustrated by Hidenori Yamaji. It was serialized in Shogakukan's Weekly Shōnen Sunday from December 2017 to January 2019, with its chapters collected in five tankōbon volumes.

Plot
An undying adventurer Riseman Sawyer tries to collect all recipes required to revive his beloved Rosalie. Along the way he retraced wherever her loved one traveled. But the recipe and the ingredients were harder than expected.

Characters
Riseman Sawyer
The protagonist of the story, husband of Rosalie. He was abused in his youth, survived a Werewolf attack after being saved by Dante, he maintains following Dante, nearly dying of hunger along the way, but still maintained his cheerful personality. He died in his wedding, fighting a one sided battle against Demons. He was revived years later by his wife, Rosalie, exchanging her life for his after getting all the recipes required. 
Marry Grave Rosalie
Riseman's wife and childhood friend. Coming from the Cult of the Grave, a group who promotes the sanctity of life, and a strong mage. She lost her husband at the day of her wedding, and traveled the world for recipes. Along the way, she have birth to her child, who encouraged her to continue the journey years later. 
Dante
A strong Human swordsman traveller. Coming from a snake-like humanoid demon race, he goes on a journey to avenge his family against the leader of his clan for killing his parents. Petrified by the enemy, he was saved by Wiseman and Zed. 
Jean
A long lived fairy, having unique strength and longevity, longer than an average fairy. She became an isolationist and cold person after losing all of her loved ones due to old age, until she met Rosalie. Years later, she met and joined Rosalie's husband Wiseman in his quest. 
Zed
A swordsman who hunts Wiseman and knows his weakness. Has a sword Valmunk, a foul-mouthed, vulgar sentient sword who always cusses Zed.
Markov
One of the antagonists. Hailed from the Gorgon demon tribe, and leader of it. Raised Dante as mockery.

Publication
Marry Grave is written and illustrated by Hidenori Yamaji. The manga was serialized in Shogakukan's Weekly Shōnen Sunday from December 13, 2017, to January 16, 2019. Shogakukan collected is chapters in five tankōbon volumes, released from April 18, 2018, to March 18, 2019.

The manga has been licensed in France by Kana and in Indonesia by M&C!.

Volume list

References

External links
Official website at Web Sunday 

Dark fantasy anime and manga
Shogakukan manga
Shōnen manga